Trans-Nzoia County is a county in the former Rift Valley Province, Kenya, located between the Nzoia River and Mount Elgon, 380 km northwest of Nairobi. At its centre is the town of Kitale which is the capital and largest town. The county borders Bungoma to the west, Uasin Gishu and Kakamega to the south, Elgeyo-Marakwet to the east, West Pokot to the north and the republic of Uganda to the Northwest. Trans Nzoia covers an area of 2495.5 square kilometres.

Historically the area has been inhabited by the sabaot people. After independence many of the farms vacated by white settlers were bought by individuals from other ethnic groups in Kenya. Kitale, its capital town, is now majorly luhya with inhabits from other tribes in Kenya occupying almost less than 1% of the population.

The county is largely agricultural with both large scale and small scale wheat, maize and dairy farming. The county is referred to as the basket of Kenya for its role in food production in the country. The majority of its inhabitants are however generally poor.

Sub-Divisions

Electoral constituencies
The county has five constituencies (sub-counties): 
Cherangany Constituency
Kwanza Constituency
Saboti Constituency
Endebess Constituency
Kiminini Constituency

Celebrities 

Situated in the slopes of the mountain, Trans Nzoia has several celebrities renown countrywide including Mulamwa (Content creator) and Chibui Milton (Social Influencer)

Paul Ereng, The 1988 Olympic champion & Former two time indoor world champion record holder

Population

Religion and culture 

Majority of people living in Trans Nzoia County are Christians. Prominent churches in the county include Anglican (ACK), Roman Catholic, Friends (Quakers), Seven-Day Adventist (SDA), and Presbyterians. There are numerous evangelical churches among them the Deliverance, African Inland Church (AIC), Africa Gospel Church (AGC),the Redeemed Church, PEFA, Christian Church International (CCI), Full Gospel and Kenya Assemblies of God (KAG). Other faiths such as Islam and Hinduism are also professed especially in major towns.

Jainism is also practiced by Oshwals in Kitale which is a religion that prescribes a path of non-violence towards all living beings while emphasising spiritual independence and equality.
The indigenous Sabaot tribe or the 'Elgon Maasai' live near Mount Elgon and are a Kalenjin sub tribe. They value their culture and guard it with pride. They are traditionally pastoralists. They used to believe that their god lived in elevated places where they couldn't reach such as on top of Mount Elgon or up in the sky. However, due to influence of Christianity, education and intermarriage, most of these traditions have been replaced by modern culture, a reason why the one time pastoralists are now big farmers in the region.

Major towns 

Located between Mt. Elgon and Cherangany Hills, Kitale is the largest town and Trans Nzoia's administrative capital. Mainly an agricultural town, Kitale has recently shown a lot of economic potential, with agribusiness, real estate and commercial businesses booming the most. The town is home to over 220,000 people and as the last stop of the Kenya railway line, it's an important center for movement of goods in the North Rift. It has popular banks, restaurants and supermarkets. Palm Restaurant, Tilja and the rooftop restaurant at Kittony Heights are the most recent hangout joints in Kitale town.

Kiminini is a small yet a busy town located some 22 kilometers along Kitale Webuye road. It's a significant agricultural center. St. Brigids National Girls High Schooll is located at this town.

Maili Saba means "seven miles" in Swahili. It is located along Kitale-Kapenguria road.

Situated at the foot of Mt. Elgon, some 17 kilometers North Western side of Kitale town, Endebess is an important agricultural town, which also serves as a local administrative and commercial center for Kwanza sub county.

Kachibora is situated at the junction of Kitale-Ziwa-Eldoret road/Kitale-Kapcherop-Kapsowar road, about 30 kilometres from Kitale town. Kachibora is a fast growing agricultural town. It is the administrative headquarters of the Trans Nzoia East sub county.

Economy 
Trans Nzoia County's arable land makes agriculture the top economic activity, where maize farming is widely practised, and mostly at a commercial level. Tea, coffee, horticulture and commercial businesses are also very significant to the county's economy. There's dairy farming and booming tourism - owing to an array of touring sites and touristic activities within the county. A number of companies such as Kenya Seed company, Elgon Tea Factory, Western Seed Company, K.C.C and various government institutions provide employment to many people living in the urban centers.

Health facilities 

There are about 78 health institutions in Trans Nzoia County - 1 County Referral Hospital, 4 Sub-county Hospitals and 33 Dispensaries. The county has 7 health centers, 28 medical clinics and about 6 nursing homes. Among the notable health facilities include Kitale Referral Hospital, Kapsara sub-county Hospital, Cherangani Sub-county Hospital, Endebess Sub-county Hospital, Mt.Elgon private hospital and Cherangani Nursing Home.

Education 

Currently, there are over 470 primary schools and 120 secondary schools in Trans Nzoia. The elite primary school in the county is Titan Academy in Matisi which features the newest technology and champions “Premier Education for the Next Generation”. Some of the prominent secondary schools include St. Brigids Girls, St. Monica, St. Joseph's Boys, Kitale School, St. Joseph's Girls, St Anthony Boys Hgh (Kitale Day),Kipkeikei boys and Boma Secondary schools. Trans Nzoia has over 20 tertiary institutions, including a university campus, a nursing training college, a teachers’ training college, farmers training institute, youth polytechnic and a number of commercial colleges.

Notable personalities 
 Michael Kijana Wamalwa former vice president, first to die in office 
 Masinde Muliro a central figure in the Kenya's politics
 Joseph Magutt, former Kenya envoy to Germany, who declared in 2019 his interest to contest for the position of governor in Trans Nzoia County
 Milcah Chemos who is a reigning Commonwealth games champion
 Wesley Korir, a long-distance runner who is a former Cherangany Member of Parliament

Places of interest 

Most outstanding places of interest include Mount Elgon National Park, Saiwa Swamp National Park and Kitale Nature Conservancy. Mt. Elgon National Park is located approximately 11 kilometers from Kitale town. Some of the wild animals found here include elephants, buffalos, black and white colobus, giant forest hog and over 420 bird species.

Saiwa Swamp National Park is located some 27 kilometers from Kitale town towards Kitale - Kapenguria road and is good for game viewing and camping. Kitale Museum, located in the heart of Kitale town is one of the most interesting places in the county. Apart from hosting varieties of traditional artifacts, the museum is also home to different snakes’ species as well as having one of the largest crocodile pits in Kenya.

Access 

From Nairobi, Trans Nzoia is accessible by road via Nakuru-Eldoret, a 380 km journey that normally takes 5–6 hours. Trans Nzoia can also be accessed by air through Kitale's small airport located about 7 kilometers from Kitale town. The road from Nairobi to Kitale is tarmacked and smooth.

References 

 
Counties of Kenya